The 2013–14 season was the 93rd season of competitive football for Rochdale, and their second consecutive season in League Two.

League table

Statistics
																								

|}

Match details

Pre-season friendlies

League Two

FA Cup

League Cup

Football League Trophy

References

 http://www.soccerbase.com/teams/team.sd?team_id=2175

Rochdale A.F.C. seasons
Rochdale